is a song recorded by Strawberry Flower for Japanese TV commercials of the Nintendo GameCube game Pikmin. It was written and produced by band member Takeshi Tomozuma. The song was later included in the “Pikmin World” soundtrack album, in three different versions.

The song is a pop ballad driven by guitar and harmonica, with soft vocals by Tomoe Watanabe. Lyrically, the song talks about the Pikmin game from the own Pikmin’s point of view, describing their actions, sacrifice and devotion to the game’s protagonist, Captain Olimar, although neither Pikmin nor Captain Olimar are mentioned by name on the song’s main version.

"Ai no Uta" became one of the biggest singles in Japan in 2002, reaching #2 on the Oricon Weekly charts and managing to be one of the best-selling singles in the country that year.

Internationally, the song received a French cover version titled "" (Your best friends), and was included in the 2008 crossover fighting video game Super Smash Bros. Brawl.

The music video was shot September 26, 2001.

Sales
Initial shipments of the record exceeded 200,000, with 30,000 additional being ordered by 7 December 2001. By 20 December, it had exceeded 460,000 units sold, and by June 2002 900,000.

"Ai no Uta" debuted at #2 on the Oricon Weekly Singles Chart, which is the highest the song reached.

Other versions
A cover of the song was released in France with the title " - Songs of Love".

Track listing
Retrieved from Oricon:
 
  
  (Instrumental)

References

External links
 

Pikmin
2001 singles
Strawberry Flower songs
Video game theme songs
2001 songs
Songs written for video games
Nintendo music